Sportovní klub Slavia Praha – fotbal (Sports Club Slavia Prague – Football), commonly known as Slavia Praha or Slavia Prague, is a Czech professional football club in Prague. Founded in 1892, they are the second most successful club in the Czech Republic since its independence in 1993.
 
They play in the Czech First League, the top division in the Czech Republic. They play the Prague derby with Sparta Prague, the most important and heated rivalry in Czech football. Slavia has won 21 titles, several Czech cups, and the Mitropa Cup in 1938. The club has won seven league titles since the foundation of the Czech league in 1993. They have also reached the semi-finals of the 1995–96 UEFA Cup and qualified for the 2007–08 UEFA Champions League group stage for the first time in their history. In 2019, Slavia reached the quarter-finals of the 2018–19 UEFA Europa League and also qualified for the 2019–20 UEFA Champions League group stage for the second time in their history. They once again reached the Europa League quarter-finals in 2020–21. In the title-winning 2020–21 Czech First League season the team completed an entire season undefeated and set a Czech record for the longest top-flight unbeaten league run at 54 games between 2020 and 2021.

In addition to their men's squad, Slavia Prague has reserve, youth, and women's teams.

History
Slavia was founded on 2 November 1892 by medicine students in Vinohrady, Prague, as a sport club aimed at increasing sport activity among students. Initially the club focused on cycling, and expanded to football in 1896. On 25 March of that year, Slavia won their first match against AC Prague 5–0. The captain of this team was Karel Freja. Four days later, Slavia played against Sparta Prague, with the match finishing 0–0, this match being the start of the rivalry between these two clubs. In 1905, Scottish manager and former Celtic player Johnny Madden brought new tactics and views on football from his home country to the club. He managed to set up an early golden age for the club that lasted 25 years. Under Madden Slavia won 134 domestic matches out of a total of 169, and 304 internationals out of 429 between the years 1905 and 1930. In 1930, Madden retired from Slavia and professional football at the age of 66, though he remained in Prague for the rest of his life.

In the 1934 World Cup, the Czechoslovak national team included eight Slavia players. The second golden period came when Slavia bought Josef Bican from Admira Vienna. Slavia with Bican won titles in 1940, 1941, 1942 and 1943, while many football players were at war. In 1951 Slavia finished in 11th position in the league. Poor results continued during the 1950s and 1960s when Slavia were relegated twice, in 1961 and 1963. They next played in the top level of football in 1965.

In 1996, Slavia won their 14th title after 49 years. During this season, Slavia played in the semi-final of the UEFA Cup and four players of this team had big importance for the silver medal-winning Czech team from UEFA Euro 1996.

Slavia participated in the qualifying rounds for the UEFA Champions League five times (1996, 2000, 2001, 2004 and 2005), being eliminated each time until finally qualifying for the group stage in the 2007–08 season following a 3–1 aggregate victory over Ajax in the third qualifying round. For the group stage, Slavia were drawn in Group H along with Arsenal, Steaua București and Sevilla. They started with a 2–1 win at home against Steaua and a 4–2 loss to Sevilla. Next came two matches against Arsenal; Slavia lost 7–0 at the Emirates Stadium, but in the second leg they managed to draw 0–0. In Bucharest came a 1–1 draw, which qualified the Czech team for the UEFA Cup round of 32, from third place in Group H, in spite of a home 0–3 defeat against Sevilla.

In October 2006, the construction of the new and long-awaited stadium at Eden for 21,000 spectators began. The stadium was opened on 7 May 2008 with an exhibition match against Oxford University.

In the 2007–08 and 2008–09, Slavia were back-to-back Czech champions, although they did not play in the Champions League group stage due to elimination in the qualifying rounds by Fiorentina (0–2 on aggregate in 2008–09) and Sheriff Tiraspol (1–1 on away goals rule in 2009–10). In the 2009–10 season the club managed only 7th place in the league.

In the autumn of 2010, the club found itself in crisis due to its economic problems. It was discovered that Slavia owed 112 million Czech koruna to the club's former owner, ENIC Sports Ltd (English National Investment Company). As a result of this, major cost-cutting was needed to service this debt and it was confirmed that the squad would need to be purged. In addition to the players sold, midfielder Petr Trapp left the club mid-season, claiming that Slavia had not paid his wages for three months.

On 5 May 2011, the first leg of the cup semi-final against Olomouc was suspended after the first half at a score of 1–1 due to Slavia fans invaded the pitch in protest against the deteriorating financial situation of the club. As a result of this action, Sigma were awarded a 3–0 win.

In September 2015, CEFC China Energy Company bought the team. Since November 2018, the club owners have been the Sinobo Group and CITIC Group.

Historical names
 1892 – SK ACOS Praha (Sportovní klub Akademický cyklistický odbor Slavia Praha)
 1893 – SK Slavia Praha (Sportovní klub Slavia Praha)
 1948 – Sokol Slavia Praha
 1949 – ZSJ Dynamo Slavia Praha (Základní sportovní jednota Dynamo Slavia Praha)
 1953 – DSO Dynamo Praha (Dobrovolná sportovní organizace Dynamo Praha)
 1954 – TJ Dynamo Praha (Tělovýchovná jednota Dynamo Praha)
 1965 – SK Slavia Praha (Sportovní klub Slavia Praha)
 1973 – TJ Slavia Praha (Tělovýchovná jednota Slavia Praha)
 1977 – TJ Slavia IPS Praha (Tělovýchovná jednota Slavia Inženýrské průmyslové stavby Praha)
 1978 – SK Slavia IPS Praha (Sportovní klub Slavia Inženýrské průmyslové stavby Praha)
 1991 – SK Slavia Praha (Sportovní klub Slavia Praha – fotbal, a.s.)

Club symbols

The club's colours, red and white, were chosen as standing for the heart and blood, and fair play and sportsmanship respectively. The inverted five-pointed star was intended to symbolise "new hope, forever strengthening the mind and uplifting the spirit." The name "Slavia" is a Latin term used in older literature to denote the lands inhabited by Slavs.

Supporters and rivalries
Slavia's greatest rivals are Sparta Prague, with whom they contest the Prague derby. A local Vršovice derby is also contested between Slavia and Bohemians 1905, whose stadium is situated a kilometre from Eden.

Slavia is widely misconceived as being a Jewish club among other fans, particularly Sparta fans, and its fans and players are often subjected to anti-semitic abuse. However, the club was not founded by Jews nor did it have any Jewish history. Football historian Vladimír Zapotocký commented in an interview that were this the case, the Nazis would have shut the club down during the wartime occupation, as they did with DFC Prag. The association stems from a friendly match played against West Ham United in 1922, when Slavia insured the match against adverse weather conditions, and the match was later cancelled due to rain. They then agreed with West Ham to play the fixture the next day, while also collecting money from the insurance company for cancelling the fixture. A week later in a Prague derby fixture, Slavia were greeted onto the pitch by chants of "vy židi!" ("you Jews!") from the Sparta fans.

In modern times, Slavia developed kinship with Hajduk Split.

Cooperations
In May 2018 a strategic cooperation with Chinese club Beijing Sinobo Guoan for both professional and youth level football started.

Players

Current squad

Out on loan

Reserve squad

Notable former players

The best known Slavia player of all time is perhaps forward Josef "Pepi" Bican, one of the most prolific goalscorers in the history of football. Other famous players include forward Antonín Puč, goalkeeper František Plánička (both of them members of the Czechoslovakia national team in two World Cups) and midfielder František Veselý. Other big names in club history are Karel Jarolím, Ivo Knoflíček, Vladimír Šmicer, Karel Poborský, Patrik Berger, Vladimír Coufal and Tomáš Souček.

Player records in the Czech First League

.

Most appearances

Most goals

Most clean sheets

Ownership and finances 

Under the Czech jurisdiction the club's legal form is a joint-stock company (updated 1 August 2020) with the largest shareholder being the Chinese real estate Sinobo Group, which has on 11 November 2018 purchased a majority stake from CITIC, at the time holding 99.98% of the 212,074 stocks worth of CZK 1.514 billion (Annual report from 30 June 2018). CITIC remains to be a minority shareholder and the companies did not reveal the distribution of the shares.

According to their chairman Jinhui Zhou, the Sinobo business model is a combination of real estate development and sports activities. In a similar business model, Sinobo owns 64% of the shares in the Chinese club Beijing Guoan where the 36% minority belongs to CITIC. Sinobo also holds the naming rights of the arena, the Sinobo Stadium.

The Chinese investment activity in Slavia has firstly started in September 2005, when a private conglomerate CEFC acquired 59.97% shares of the club through its Czech subsidiary CEFC Group (Europe) Company a.s. from Aleš Řebíček for CZK 27 million. Through the course of the years, the share has increased to 67% and 80%, and on 22 November 2016 CEFC has capitalized its loan into the equity and increased their shares to 99.96% which made them the sole owner. In early 2018, it turned out that CEFC had serious financial problems and CITIC bought the club and arena. In late 2018, CITIC transferred Slavia's majority stake to the Chinese company Sinobo Group.

Slavia's financial results for the 2017–18 season show group revenue of CZK 837.4 million, with a profit before tax of CZK <366.7> million.

Management 
The club's current manager is Jindřich Trpišovský, who joined the club in December 2017 from Slovan Liberec. He replaced Jaroslav Šilhavý, who was appointed in September 2016 and moved on to manage the Czech national team. There have been 65 managers in Slavia's history. The club's first professional coach, Johnny Madden, was appointed in 1905, serving in that position until 1930. He remains the club's longest-serving coach in terms of both length of tenure and number of games overseen.

Head Coach: Jindřich Trpišovský
Assistant Coach: Jaroslav Köstl
Assistant Coach: Zdeněk Houštecký
Assistant Coach: Pavel Řehák
Assistant Coach: Abdulhakeem Al-Tuwaijri
Goalkeeper Coach: Štěpán Kolář
Goalkeeper Coach: Radek Černý
Fitness Coach: Martin Třasák

Former coaches 
Only competitive matches are counted.

 Johnny Madden (1905–30)
 Josef Štaplík (1930–33)
 Kálmán Konrád (1933–35)
 Jan Reichardt (1935–38)
 Emil Seifert (1939–46)
 Josef Pojar (1946–47)
 Viliam König (1947–48)
 Jan Reichardt (1949)
 Viliam König (1950–51)
 Emil Seifert (1952–53)
 Josef Bican (1954–56)
 Antonín Rýgr (1956–58)
 Josef Forejt (1958)
 Antonín Rýgr (1959)
 Vlastimil Kopecký (1959)
 Karel Finek (1959–60)
 Josef Forejt (1960)
 Antonín Rýgr (1960–63)
 Karel Finek (1963–64)
 František Ipser (1964–66)
 Vratislav Fikejz (1966)
 Mirko Paráček (1966)
 František Havránek (1966–68)
 Jiří Nedvídek (1968–69)
 Josef Forejt (1969–70)
 Antonín Rýgr (1970–72)
 Miroslav Linhart (1972)
 Rudolf Vytlačil (1973)
 Jaroslav Jareš (1973–79)
 Bohumil Musil (1979–80)
 Josef Bouška (1981)
 Miroslav Starý (1981)
 Milan Máčala (1982–84)
 Jaroslav Jareš (1984–86)
 Vlastimil Petržela (1986–87)
 Tomáš Pospíchal (1987–88)
 Ivan Kopecký (1988–89)
 Vlastimil Petržela (1990–92)
 Jozef Jarabinský (1992–93)
 Jindřich Dejmal (1993–94)
 Miroslav Beránek (1994–95)
 František Cipro (1995–97)
 Pavel Tobiáš (1997–98)
 Petr Rada (1998)
 Jaroslav Hřebík (1998–99)
 František Cipro (1999–00)
 Karel Jarolím (2000–01)
 Josef Pešice (2001)
 Miroslav Beránek (2001–03)
 Josef Csaplár (Jan 04–Apr 05)
 Karel Jarolím (Jul 05–Mar 10)
 František Cipro (Mar 10–May 10)
 Karel Jarolím (Jul 10–Sep 10)
 Michal Petrouš (Sep 10–Oct 11)
 František Straka (Oct 11–Mar 12)
 Martin Poustka (Mar 12–Jun 12)
 Petr Rada (Jul 12–Apr 13)
 Michal Petrouš (Apr 13–Sep 13)
 Miroslav Koubek (Sep 13– Mar 14)
 Alex Pastoor (Mar 14–May 14)
 Miroslav Beránek (Jun 14–Jun 15)
 Dušan Uhrin Jr. (Jun 15–Aug 16)
 Jaroslav Šilhavý (Sep 16–Dec 17)
 Jindřich Trpišovský (Dec 2017–present)

Honours

In European football

Progress in UEFA competitions

UEFA club coefficient
.

Club records
Biggest win: Fenerbahçe 1–10 Slavia Prague (1923)

Czech First League records
Best position: 1st (1995–96, 2007–08, 2008–09, 2016–17, 2018–19, 2019–20)
Worst position: 13th (2013–14)
Biggest home win: Slavia Prague 9–1 Slovácká Slavia Uherské Hradiště (1995–96) 
Biggest away win: Příbram 1–8 Slavia Prague (2016–17)
Biggest home defeat: Slavia Prague 0–7 Teplice (2013–14)
Biggest away defeat: Ostrava 5–0 Slavia Prague (1998–99)

Notes

References

External links

 Website of the Eden Stadium (archived 31 March 2007)
 UEFA's Slavia site

 *
Football clubs in the Czech Republic
Football clubs in Prague
Association football clubs established in 1892
Prague, Slavia
Prague, Slavia
Prague, Slavia
Football clubs in Austria-Hungary